Kermesse (or Kermess) may refer to one of the following:

Kermesse (cycling), a variety of cycling road race
Kermesse (festival), a local festival, originally relating to a church
La Kermesse Franco-Americaine Festival, A local festival celebrating French Canadian culture
Carnival in Flanders  known in French as La Kermesse héroïque, a film by Jacques Feyder
Kermess, a rock band from Quebec, Canada
Kermesse (1959 film) featuring Fanny Schiller